Paraclemensia viridis is a moth of the family Incurvariidae. It is found in Japan (Kyushu).

The wingspan is 10–14 mm. The forewings are dark brown with a greenish lustre.

The larvae feed on Carpinus species, including Carpinus tschonoskii.

References

Moths described in 1982
Incurvariidae
Moths of Japan